Welcome 2 America is the 40th and final studio album by American musician Prince. It was posthumously released through NPG Records on July 30, 2021. Recorded in March 2010 before the Welcome 2 America Tour, it is the first full previously unreleased studio album of Prince material to be released posthumously.

Background
In 2008, Tal Wilkenfeld received a phone call from Prince. The 21-year-old, Australian-born musician was surprised to hear Prince on the other end of the line, who said he had been watching YouTube videos of her on repeat. Prince brought Wilkenfeld to parties at his Los Angeles home where sometimes he and his band played and she was their lone audience member, spent a few days jamming in a local studio and drove around together in a limo listening to music.

In 2009, Prince called Wilkenfeld from Minneapolis and said that he wanted to put together a trio with her, asking Wilkenfeld to find them a drummer. They settled on Chris Coleman, and Prince flew the two musicians to Paisley Park for the first time in late 2009. In March 2010, Wilkenfeld travelled to Paisley Park and began to improvise and play chords on instruction from Prince. "I just made everything up; he gave me no direction about what to play beyond a chord here or there. It was just do your thing," Wilkenfeld explained. "I never heard the lyrics, never knew what the songs were about, never heard the melody. It was like we had to be psychic when we were playing," she added. The result of this work culminated in Welcome 2 America.

Prince started out recording instrumental tracks live in the studio with Wilkenfeld and Coleman. Then Prince recorded New Power Generation singers Liv Warfield, Shelby Johnson and Elisa Fiorillo, sharing leads and harmonies with them. Morris Hayes added keyboards and simulated string and horn arrangements, earning credit as co-producer for six of the album's 12 songs. 
Prince told Wilkenfeld that he was feeling inspired by the Jimi Hendrix Experience. "Even though it later evolved into having keyboards and background vocals," says Wilkenfeld, "the album was essentially recorded as a trio, so it has that raw vibe."

It is unknown why the album was shelved for 11 years. Even a decade later, those who worked on the album still don't totally understand why. "That was a surprise to me," Morris Hayes says. If he had to guess, Prince might've axed it because not all of the album's collaborators including Wilkenfeld were able to join Prince on the road. "I only surmised that if he couldn't put this album out with the crew he created it with, then I think it was a big mitigating factor in why it hit the shelf," Hayes says. "Prince had this thing where he would shoot first and ask questions later. And if he didn't have commitment from all those people that we could go out and make a big splash – with a new band, a new Prince – then the balloon would just go down. If all those things weren't aligned, that would cause that (music) to go in the vault."

On April 8, 2021, the Prince estate announced the release of Welcome 2 America.

Songs
"Hot Summer" was premiered on Minnesota public radio station 89.3 The Current's website on June 7, 2010, Prince's 52nd birthday, prior to the album's intended release. "Same Page, Different Book" was streamed as audio only over a static video on 3rdeyegirl's YouTube channel in January 2013. "1000 Light Years from Here" was released in an alternative version with new lyrics and arrangements in 2015 on Hit n Run Phase Two as a 3:05 coda to the track "Black Muse". An alternative version of "When She Comes" with different lyrics was also released on Hit n Run Phase Two. "Stand Up and B Strong" is a cover of a song by Soul Asylum, originally released on their 2006 album The Silver Lining.

Critical reception

Welcome 2 America was met with generally positive reviews from music critics. At Metacritic, which assigns a normalized rating out of 100 to reviews from mainstream publications, the album received an average score of 76, based on 16 reviews, indicating "generally favourable reviews".

Noel Murray from The A.V. Club described Welcome 2 America as "fantastic" and as an "incredibly entertaining and vital set of music". Andrew Trendell from NME wrote that it's an album "that speaks to today’s problems and demands to be heard". Writing for Rolling Stone, Kory Grow opined that Welcome 2 America contains "stronger songs and sharper messages than much of the music he [Prince] released during his final years". Grow explained that the "grooves are funkier, the sex jams are sexier, and the Curtis Mayfield homages are superflyier".

Jon Pareles, reviewing the album for The New York Times, wrote: "The songs take on racism, exploitation, disinformation, celebrity, faith and capitalism: '21st century, it's still about greed and fame,' Prince sings in 'Running Game (Son of a Slave Master).' Eleven years after the album was recorded—as the 2020s have brought bitter divisiveness, blatant racism, battles over history and a digital hellscape of hyped consumption and algorithmically boosted lies—Prince doesn't sound pessimistic, just matter-of-fact."

Track listing

Personnel
Performers
Prince – lead vocals, background vocals, guitars, keyboards, percussion, handclaps, drum machine; synth bass (10-12); all instruments (10)
Tal Wilkenfeld – bass guitar on all tracks except 4, 10
Chris Coleman – drums
Morris Hayes – keyboards, percussion (1-3, 5, 7-8)
Shelby Johnson – background vocals
Liv Warfield – background vocals
Elisa Fiorillo – background vocals

Charts

Weekly charts

Year-end charts

References

2021 albums
Prince (musician) albums
Albums produced by Prince (musician)
Albums published posthumously
NPG Records albums